Astrée is an opera by the French composer Pascal Collasse, first performed at the Académie Royale de Musique (the Paris Opéra) on 25 November 1691. It takes the form of a tragédie lyrique in three acts. The libretto, by Jean de La Fontaine, is based on the romance Astrée by Honoré d'Urfé. The opera was a failure.

Sources
 Libretto at "Livrets baroques" 
 Félix Clément and Pierre Larousse Dictionnaire des Opéras, Paris, 1881.

Operas
Tragédies en musique
French-language operas
1691 operas
Operas by Pascal Collasse